Ivan Derventski (12 June 1932 – 4 December 2018) was a Bulgarian footballer. He played in three matches for the Bulgaria national football team from 1957 to 1958.

References

External links
 

1932 births
2018 deaths
Bulgarian footballers
Bulgaria international footballers
Place of birth missing
Association football goalkeepers
PFC Levski Sofia players